Mert Özyıldırım (born 28 February 1995) is a Turkish footballer who plays as midfielder for Nazilli Belediyespor. He can also play as a center-back.

Career
Mert made his senior debut with Kayserispor in a 2-0 loss to Akhisar Belediyespor on 21 August 2016.

References

External links

1995 births
People from Yenimahalle
People from Ankara
Living people
Turkish footballers
Association football midfielders
Kayserispor footballers
Vanspor footballers
Turgutluspor footballers
Akhisarspor footballers
Nazilli Belediyespor footballers
Süper Lig players
TFF First League players
TFF Second League players
TFF Third League players